Lea Michele Sarfati (born August 29, 1986) is an American stage and television actress, singer, and songwriter. She began her career as a child actress on Broadway, appearing in productions of Les Misérables (1995–1996), Ragtime (1997–1999), Fiddler on the Roof (2004–2005), and Spring Awakening (2006–2008). Michele came to prominence playing Rachel Berry on the Fox series Glee (2009–2015), for which she received an Emmy Award nomination, two Golden Globe nominations and won four People's Choice Awards, three Teen Choice Awards and a Satellite Award. Michele and the rest of the Glee cast earned a Screen Actors Guild Award for Outstanding Performance by an Ensemble in a Comedy Series from four nominations and three Grammy Award nominations for music recorded for the series, also spawning multiple hits on the Billboard charts. Michele subsequently starred as Hester Ulrich on the Fox series Scream Queens (2015–2016) and as Valentina Barella on the ABC sitcom The Mayor (2017).

Michele made her feature film debut in New Year's Eve (2011), and was signed to Columbia Records in 2012. She released her debut single the following year, "Cannonball", followed by her debut studio album, Louder (2014), which debuted at number 4 on the Billboard 200 chart in the United States. Three years later, she released her second studio album, Places (2017), which debuted at number 28 on the Billboard 200. In 2019, she released Christmas in the City, her third studio album. Michele has also published two books, Brunette Ambition (2014) and You First: Journal Your Way to Your Best Life (2015).

On September 6, 2022, Michele returned to Broadway starring as Fanny Brice in the musical revival of Funny Girl, where she received widespread critical acclaim for her performance.

Early life and education 
Lea Michele Sarfati was born in The Bronx, New York. She is the only child of Edith Thomasina (née Porcelli), a retired nurse, and Mark David Sarfati, a real estate agent and former delicatessen owner. Her mother is an Italian American with ancestors from Rome and Naples, while her father is a Sephardic Jew with Judaeo-Spanish-speaking ancestors from Thessaloniki, Greece. Michele was raised in her mother's Catholic faith, and has stated that her father "gladly" attended Mass with them. She spent the first four years of her life living in the Bronx, until she and her parents moved to the more suburban area of Tenafly, New Jersey. The family also rented an apartment in Manhattan, where they would live when Michele was performing on Broadway. Michele was educated at Rockland Country Day School for elementary school in Congers, New York.

Michele started using her middle name at an early age. When she went on her first audition, for the role of Young Cosette in Les Misérables, she gave her name as Lea Michele, and has used it professionally ever since. Michele stated that she intentionally left off her surname because she was teased about its pronunciation. During the audition, she sang "Angel of Music" from The Phantom of the Opera – the only musical she knew at the time. Michele went along to support a friend, but ended up landing the part herself. In 1997, Michele was homeschooled while living and working in Toronto, where she performed in a production of Ragtime. For her high school education, Michele attended Tenafly High School. During her time there, she was on the volleyball team, the debate team, and participated in choir. In her teens, when she was not working on the stage, Michele had a part-time job at a bat mitzvah dress shop. She also worked at her father's deli.

Michele refrained from auditioning for Broadway roles during her freshman, sophomore and junior years so she could focus on her education. In the summers of 2000, 2001, and 2002, Michele attended Stagedoor Manor, a performing arts training center in the Catskills. At Stagedoor she was part of the touring troupe Our Time Cabaret, and performed in productions of Side by Side by Sondheim and The Who's Tommy. In her final summer at the camp, Michele was to perform in a production of Sweet Charity, but instead booked the role of Wendla Bergmann in a workshop of Spring Awakening, forcing her to drop out. She was later accepted to New York University's Tisch School of the Arts, but opted instead to continue working professionally on the stage. When Michele was 19 years old, her mother Edith was diagnosed with uterine cancer. Edith received treatment from the Memorial Sloan Kettering Cancer Center in New York City.

Career

1995–2008: Beginnings and stage roles 
Michele made her Broadway debut in 1995, at the age of eight, as a replacement in the role of Young Cosette in Les Misérables. Michele was also the understudy for the role of Gavroche. This was followed by the role of the Little Girl in the 1998 original Broadway cast of Ragtime. Michele portrayed the part of the Little Girl for a year in the original Toronto cast, before the production was transferred to Broadway. As a child, she voiced a main character, Christina, in the animated film Buster & Chauncey's Silent Night, released on October 13, 1998. In 2004, Michele began portraying Shprintze in the Broadway revival of the musical Fiddler on the Roof, and understudied the role of Chava. She also performed on the cast recording of the show.

Michele next played the role of Wendla Bergmann in Steven Sater and Duncan Sheik's musical version of Spring Awakening, starring in early workshops and Off-Broadway performances, before finally originating the role in the 2006 Broadway production at the age of twenty. In February 2005, she performed as Wendla at the Lincoln Center for the Performing Arts. Around the same time that Spring Awakening was set to go to Broadway, Michele was offered the role of Éponine Thénardier in the Broadway revival of Les Misérables. She elected to remain with Spring Awakening, which premiered on Broadway in December 2006. For her performance, she was nominated for the Drama Desk Award for Outstanding Actress in a Musical. In January 2008, Michele starred in a concert production of the musical Alive in the World as Phoebe, aiding the Twin Towers Orphan Fund.

In April 2008, she performed a Flops n' Cutz concert at Joe's Pub with her boyfriend at the time, stage actor Landon Beard. She also debuted her solo cabaret Once Upon a Dream at Feinstein's at the Loews Regency. In May 2008, Michele left the Broadway cast of Spring Awakening with her co-star Jonathan Groff. She then performed as Claudia Octavia in a reading of Sheik and Sater's new musical, Nero, in July 2008 at Vassar College. In August 2008, she portrayed Éponine in the Hollywood Bowl's Les Misérables concert, which was directed by Richard Jay-Alexander. She starred alongside Brian Stokes Mitchell as Javert and John Lloyd Young as Marius Pontmercy, both of whom would go on to guest star on Glee. While in Los Angeles for the Les Misérables concerts, she sang at the Upright Cabaret at Mark's Restaurant in Hollywood in August 2008. The next month, she performed at the benefit Broadway Chance Style: Up Close & Personal along with stars such as Laura Bell Bundy, Eden Espinosa and Kristoffer Cusick.

2009–2012: Glee and mainstream success 

From 2009 until its ending in 2015, Michele starred in the Fox musical comedy-drama series Glee as Rachel Berry, the show's female lead and star singer. The role was written specifically for Michele by co-creator Ryan Murphy. Michele won a number of awards for portraying Rachel, including the 2009 Satellite Award for Best Actress – Television Series Musical or Comedy. She was also nominated for the 2009 Golden Globe Award for Best Actress – Television Series Musical or Comedy, and the 2010 Primetime Emmy Award for Outstanding Lead Actress in a Comedy Series.

Michele was included on Time list of the 100 Most Influential People In the World for 2010. In December 2010, she received Billboard first-ever Triple Threat Award. Several songs performed by Michele on the show were released as singles available for digital download. Her cover of The All-American Rejects' song "Gives You Hell" reached the top 40 on the Billboard Hot 100. Michele was featured as lead singer for 14 of the top 20 best-selling Glee cast songs as of 2010. In 2011, she was nominated for two Grammy Awards, for Best Pop Performance by a Duo or Group with Vocals ("Don't Stop Believin'") and Best Compilation Soundtrack Album (Glee: The Music, Volume 1). That same year, Michele was nominated again for the Golden Globe Award for Best Actress – Television Series Musical or Comedy. In 2012 and 2013, she won the People's Choice Award for Favorite TV Comedy Actress.

In May 2010, Michele and the cast of Glee embarked on a music tour of the United States, playing 10 shows in Phoenix, Los Angeles, Chicago, and New York City. The final show of 2010 was at Radio City Music Hall. Jonathan Groff, who played Michele's love interest Jesse St. James on the show, performed with her at the Los Angeles and New York City shows. Glee Live! In Concert! then expanded a year later to include 22 shows across North America and 9 shows in England and Ireland. The cast acted in character for the concerts, which were met with positive reviews.

In October 2010, Michele and co-star Matthew Morrison performed as Janet Weiss and Brad Majors, respectively, in the 35th anniversary benefit concert of The Rocky Horror Picture Show. The event benefited The Painted Turtle and also starred Jack Nicholson and Danny DeVito. In February 2011, Michele performed at The Grammys' MusiCares Person of the Year event in Los Angeles, honoring Barbra Streisand. She sang "My Man" from the Streisand film Funny Girl. Before the Super Bowl XLV on February 6, 2011, Michele performed "America the Beautiful" with the United States Air Force Tops In Blue. She then starred in Garry Marshall's romantic comedy film New Year's Eve portraying Elise, a back-up singer and the love interest of Ashton Kutcher's character. The film was released worldwide on December 9, 2011.

2013–2016: Louder and Scream Queens 

On September 18, 2012, it was announced that Michele would be working on her first solo album. She began recordings for the album soon after on October 19, 2012. Michele stated that it was a "pretty slow process" and the album would be more "pop/rock driven" rather than Broadway influenced. On November 27, 2013, it was announced that the first single from her debut album Louder would be "Cannonball", which was released on December 10, 2013. "Cannonball" debuted at number 75 on the Billboard Hot 100, making her the first main Glee cast member to chart as a lead soloist. The single sold over 51,000 copies in its first week of sale. The music video was released on January 9, 2014. Michele subsequently released four promotional singles in the lead-up to the album: "Battlefield", "Louder", "What Is Love?", and "You're Mine". Louder was released on February 28, 2014, and debuted on the Billboard 200 at number four, selling over 62,000 copies in its first week. The second single from the album, "On My Way", was released on May 4, 2014, with the music video premiering on May 19, 2014.

Michele next voiced the lead role of Dorothy Gale in the animated musical film Legends of Oz: Dorothy's Return, which opened in North American theaters on May 9, 2014. In May 2013, it was announced that Michele had signed a deal with Harmony Books and Random House to pen a part memoir, part how-to book titled Brunette Ambition. The book was released on May 20, 2014. Michele had multiple book signings in the United States, including a signing and Q&A event hosted by Jonathan Groff. The book debuted at number nine on the U.S. Nonfiction Best Seller list a week after it was released, and made its debut on The New York Times Best Seller list at number three. Michele released a second book, You First: Journal Your Way to Your Best Life, on September 22, 2015, which was also published by Random House.

In July 2014, it was announced that Michele would guest star in the final season of FX's drama series Sons of Anarchy, playing the role of Gertie, a truck stop waitress who connects with Gemma Teller Morrow (Katey Sagal). Michele's episode, "Smoke 'em If You Got 'em", aired on October 14, 2014. From 2015 to 2016, Michele starred in the Fox horror-comedy series Scream Queens, alongside original scream queen Jamie Lee Curtis, portraying the quirky, neck brace-wearing Hester Ulrich. She was nominated for the People's Choice Award for Favorite Actress in a New TV Series, and two Teen Choice Awards for Choice TV Actress: Comedy and Choice TV: Villain for her performance in the role. On March 15, 2016, the charity single "This Is for My Girls", on which Michele was one of eight featured singers, was released as a charity single. The song, written by Diane Warren, benefited the White House's #62MillionGirls campaign and the Obama administration's Let Girls Learn initiative, set up by the First Lady of the United States Michelle Obama.

2017–2021: Further television work and albums 

Michele began recording for her second studio album in April 2015. She stated that the album would be less pop-influenced than her debut, and would "[go] back to [her] roots" with a more theatrical sound. In January 2017, Michele played three shows on a mini tour titled An Intimate Evening with Lea Michele, to support her second studio album, Places. The tour continued with additional shows in the UK and North America in April and May 2017. The lead single from the second album, "Love Is Alive", was released on March 3, 2017. Three promotional singles were subsequently released in the lead-up to the album: "Anything's Possible", "Run to You", and "Getaway Car". Places was released on April 28, 2017, and debuted at number 28 on the Billboard 200 chart with over 16,000 units sold in its first week.

On April 4, 2017, Michele appeared as Amanda in the first episode of Hulu's science fiction anthology series Dimension 404, alongside Robert Buckley and Joel McHale. She subsequently portrayed political advisor Valentina Barella in ABC's sitcom The Mayor, created by Jeremy Bronson and executive produced by Daveed Diggs, starring opposite Brandon Micheal Hall and Yvette Nicole Brown. On October 8, 2017, Michele performed as a headlining act at the third annual musical theatre festival Elsie Fest, founded by her Glee co-star Darren Criss. In April 2018, it was announced that Michele would venture on a co-headlining tour with Criss. The LM/DC Tour included shows in several North American cities in May and June 2018. The tour continued from October to December 2018 in the United Kingdom and Ireland.

In May 2019, it was announced that Michele will host a health and wellness digital series for the Ellen DeGeneres Network, titled Well, Well, Well with Lea Michele. Michele's third studio album, Christmas in the City, was released on October 25, 2019. She also starred as the lead in a holiday television film, Same Time, Next Christmas, for ABC. From December 19, 2019, Lea Michele performed live with a series of shows in The Concert Hall at the New York Society for Ethical Culture.

Michele released her cover album, Forever: A Lullaby Album, on November 5, 2021.

2022–present: Broadway return
On July 11, 2022, it was announced that Michele would return to Broadway in the stage musical production of Funny Girl. Michele replaced Beanie Feldstein in the leading role of Fanny Brice on September 6, 2022 after Feldstein announced an exit from the production two months earlier than originally planned. She is scheduled to perform seven shows a week, excluding Thursday evenings.  The parallels between Michele taking on the role and her Glee character's story line where she lands her dream role in the musical's first Broadway revival have been widely discussed in the media. Her character's obsession with the musical was written into Glee in part because of Michele's own interest in it since she first saw the movie adaptation in 2007. On September 11, 2022, four days into her run as Fanny Brice, Michele announced that she had tested positive for COVID-19, requiring her to isolate for at least ten days. She returned to the stage on September 20, 2022. 

Critics widely praised Michele's performance. On opening night, Michele received multiple standing ovations for her performance, which had been highly anticipated. Jackson McHenry writing for Vulture stated, "With every eye roll toward the audience and every belt, Michele seems to face the pressure to not just be good, or great, but the greatest. This is less a star vehicle than gladiatorial combat. She makes it through with blood on the sand." Jesse Green, writing for The New York Times, initially gave the musical a poor review when it starred Beanie Feldstein. After seeing Michele's iteration, he praised her performance, while maintaining his criticisms of the overall production, stating, "Both vulnerable and invulnerable, kooky and ardent, [Michele] makes the show worth watching again. She can't make it good, though. Michael Mayer's production is still garish and pushy, pandering for audience overreaction."

In March 2023, it was announced that the show would have its final performance on September 3, 2023.

Artistry

Influences 
One of the most significant influential figures in Michele's life is Barbra Streisand whom she cites as her "role model". Her mother Edith would play her films when she was a child. Michele dedicated a chapter in her book Brunette Ambition to Streisand, noting that it is important for people to have someone to look up to. Michele wrote, "I really love her, she's always been such a role model to me. She's someone who has built her career on focusing on what makes her unique and what makes her special." An actress who influenced Michele was Natalie Wood. Michele said that she would watch West Side Story as a child and want to play the role of Maria.

Actress and singer Audra McDonald has also been an influence on Michele. She told The Fresno Bee, "Audra is probably the best singer in the world – up there with Barbra. I don't think she has any idea what an influence she had on me. I would say 80% of my singing knowledge came from Audra... How to warm up. How to breathe. How to take care of my voice. All of my beliefs are because Audra instilled them in me." Recording artist Alanis Morissette has been an inspiration throughout Michele's career. Morissette's album Jagged Little Pill was the first album Michele purchased, and in a 2014 interview has said she still owns. She said, "I love Alanis Morissette... All of her songs are lyrically so beautiful and vocally she's so strong." Celine Dion has also influenced her as a singer.

Voice 

Michele possesses a soprano vocal range. As of 2013, her voice reportedly spans 2.7 octaves and one semitone. Michele's vocals have been repeatedly praised. However, Christopher Weingarten of Rolling Stone critiqued that Michele's voice is "a little too perfect" for pop music charts. The Boston Globe stated that her voice is a "mighty soprano" and that Michele's vocals are most comfortable when she "straddles the line between Katy Perry and Celine Dion." Hanh Nguyen wrote of Michele's voice on the Glee Live! In Concert! tour, "One can truly hear the quality of the live vocals, which in the case of Lea Michele is the real deal. She sounds even better than on the show... Her "Don't Rain On My Parade" live is an amazing and thrilling treat." Billboard called her live performance of "Love Is Alive" on The Late Late Show with James Corden an "emotional performance [that] showcased Michele's strong vocal ability."

Reception and public image

Michele has received multiple accolades throughout her career. Her breakthrough performance as Rachel Berry in the Fox musical series Glee received widespread recognition, for which she was nominated for the Primetime Emmy Award for Outstanding Lead Actress in a Comedy Series in 2010 and twice consecutively for the Golden Globe Award for Best Actress in a Television Series  Musical or Comedy; and once in 2011 for the Grammy Award for Best Pop Performance by a Duo or Group with Vocals for the cast performance of "Don't Stop Believin'". As a member of the series' ensemble cast, Michele won a Screen Actors Guild Award for Outstanding Performance by an Ensemble in a Comedy Series once in 2010 out of four consecutive nominations. Prior to Glee, Michele received some recognition on stage, earning a Drama Desk Award nomination for her role in a 2007 production of Spring Awakening. In 2022, Michele returned to Broadway playing Fanny Brice in a revival of Funny Girl, to widespread critical acclaim.

In June 2020, actress Samantha Marie Ware accused Michele of bullying her and causing "traumatic microaggressions" while they worked together on the sixth season of Glee. Ware made her comments in direct response to Michele having posted a message on social media saying "George Floyd did not deserve this. This was not an isolated incident and it must end. #BlackLivesMatter." Other actors, including former Glee co-stars Heather Morris, Alex Newell, and Amber Riley, among others, agreed that Michele had been hostile and rude to others on set, and had had a prima donna attitude. Riley and Morris disputed the implication that Michele's behavior had been racist. Michele responded with an apology, noting that the comments from numerous cast members in response to Ware's accusation had made her aware that her general treatment of all cast members during those years was "insensitive or inappropriate", a sign of "immaturity", and that she was "unnecessarily difficult" toward others around her, and she would "keep working to better myself and take responsibility for my actions."

Michele has been the subject of rumors, conspiracy theories, and jokes that she is illiterate since 2017, with the rumor becoming a popular Internet meme in March 2018 and again in 2022. The rumor started with Jaye Hunt and Robert Ackerman of the podcast One More Thing as they were discussing a scene from Naya Rivera's memoir Sorry Not Sorry in which Michele refused to improvise scenes with Tim Conway. Michele responded in an interview with The New York Times in September 2022, saying, "I went to Glee every single day; I knew my lines every single day, and then there's a rumor online that I can't read or write? It's sad. It really is. I think often if I were a man, a lot of this wouldn't be the case."

Other projects

Philanthropy 

Michele supported Broadway Cares/Equity Fights AIDS, performing in December 2007 at the Lucille Lortel Theatre for Unsung: 'Tis The Season To Be Naughty. She has also participated in Broadway Barks, Broadway Bares, the Easter Bonnet Competition, and the Flea Market and Grand Auction. Michele has been active in campaigning for animal rights; in 2008, she appeared in the PETA advertising campaign "Buck Cruelty! Say No to Horse-Drawn Carriage Rides". In 2008, Michele performed in a benefit concert production of Alive in the World to aid the Twin Towers Orphan Fund. In support of gay rights, she performed at the Human Rights Campaign dinner in November 2009. In the same month, Michele and Jonathan Groff performed for True Colors Cabaret, a fundraiser in support of gay, lesbian, bisexual and transgender equality. In April 2010, Michele appeared in a public service announcement for PETA, speaking out against fur clothing. In September 2010, Michele was honored by PETA for her work with animals. In 2010 Lea Michele was introduced in Time 100 list for her artistic talent and the ability to influence student participation in school activities.

In October 2010, Michele performed at a benefit concert for The Painted Turtle. The concert celebrated the 35th anniversary of The Rocky Horror Picture Show, with Michele playing the lead role of Janet Weiss. In February 2011, she performed for the Grammy Award's MusiCares benefit in Los Angeles. In April 2012, Michele performed for the Jonsson Cancer Center Foundation's 17th annual signature fundraiser, Taste for a Cure, at UCLA with her Glee co-star Darren Criss. In October 2012, she and Criss performed together at the Big Brothers Big Sisters of Greater Los Angeles 2012 Stars Gala. In July 2012, Michele hosted the launch of the Valspar Hands for Habitat charity auction, donating a signed hand print to be auctioned off. Money raised from the auction benefited Habitat for Humanity's disaster response programs. Michele has been an ambassador for L'Oréal's Women of Worth program since December 2012, celebrating women who have positively impacted their communities. In June 2013, she co-hosted the launch of Feed America for Target stores. Proceeds from the lifestyle collection benefited Feeding America.

In August 2013, Michele once again donated a hand print to the Valspar Hands for Habitat charity auction. She was then the host of the fundraiser "Lea Michele's Night of Shopping and Cocktails" on December 14, 2013, presented by SodaStream, which benefited Chrysalis, a non-profit organization helping homeless people find work. In April 2014, Michele and Darren Criss once again performed together at the 19th annual Taste for a Cure event for the Jonsson Cancer Center Foundation. In October 2014, she teamed up with Evian to encourage women to perform their own breast exams in an attempt to raise awareness of early cancer detection. In February 2016, it was announced that Michele would collaborate with Burt's Bees in a campaign to act on the declining population of bees.

In June 2016, the Human Rights Campaign released a video in tribute to the victims of the 2016 Orlando gay nightclub shooting, in which Michele and other celebrities told the stories of the people killed there. Michele continues to support the Los Angeles-based non-profit Step Up and attends their annual Step Up Inspiration Awards event. In April 2017, Barnes & Noble donated a portion of every purchase of Places to Step Up. In November 2017, Michele partnered with eBay to design a pin to benefit Feeding America; she also auctioned off a set visit to one of her projects in 2018. In April 2019, she performed for the "A Grand Night" fundraising gala held at the Mark Taper Forum in Los Angeles. On May 1, 2019, Michele joined Former First Lady Michelle Obama at Reach Higher's 2019 College Signing Day. On November 24, 2019 she visited ill children at Children's Health Care of Atlanta.

Product endorsements 
In 2007, along with her Spring Awakening co-stars, Michele was featured in a Gap Inc. marketing campaign. The campaign included magazine advertisement spreads and billboards in Times Square. In 2010, Michele became a spokesmodel for beauty company Dove, performing the song "My Favorite Things" from The Sound of Music in television commercials for the brand. The following year, she appeared in a Super Bowl commercial for Chevrolet, along with most of her Glee co-stars. She performed the song "See the USA in Your Chevrolet" as Rachel Berry. Also in 2011, Michele became a spokesperson for a Nike workout application. In September 2011, she appeared in commercials for the HP TouchPad.

In January 2012, Candie's announced that Michele would be the spokesmodel for their brand, taking over from Vanessa Hudgens who was the face of the brand for the previous year. In September 2012, it was revealed that Michele had signed an estimated $1 million deal to be a spokesperson for L'Oréal Paris. She has appeared in magazine spreads and television commercials promoting their products. In September 2015, Pixelberry Studios announced their collaboration with Michele, launching High School Story with Lea Michele, a celebrity takeover update of their popular app. In December 2018 Michele teamed with Old Navy and Lyft to announce free car sharing to stores for holidays. In February 2019, Michele appeared in a commercial for ZOLA, a wedding planning website.

Michele had a partnership with meal kit delivery service HelloFresh until June 2, 2020, when the company announced they had ended their partnership with her as a result of a controversy surrounding accusations of bullying against Michele.

Personal life
Michele began working with actor Cory Monteith in 2008, when they were cast as love interests on Glee. In February 2012, the media reported that they had begun dating. They remained together until his death in July 2013.

On April 28, 2018, Michele announced her engagement to businessman Zandy Reich. They were married on March 9, 2019, in Napa, California. On May 2, 2020, Michele announced that she and Reich were expecting their first child. Michele gave birth to a son on August 20, 2020.

In September 2019, Michele revealed she had polycystic ovary syndrome (PCOS). She was diagnosed around the age of 30, having struggled with symptoms such as weight gain and acne since the end of Glee.

Performances

Film and television
 Buster & Chauncey's Silent Night (1998)
 Glee (20092015)
 Glee: The 3D Concert Movie (2011)
 New Year's Eve (2011)
 Scream Queens (20152016)
 The Mayor (20172018)

Stage
 Les Misérables (19951996 and 2008)
 Ragtime (1997 and 19981999)
 The Diary of Anne Frank (2004)
 Fiddler on the Roof (20042005)
 Spring Awakening (20062008)
 Les Misérables (2008)
 The Rocky Horror Show (2010)
 The Little Mermaid (2019)
 Funny Girl (20222023)

Concert tours and residencies
 Once Upon a Dream (2008)
 Glee Live! In Concert! (2010–2011)
 An Intimate Evening with Lea Michele (2017)
 LM/DC Tour (with Darren Criss) (2018)
 Christmas in NYC: Live in Concert (2019)
 Spring Awakening Reunion Concert (2021) 
 Life in Music Tour (2022)

Discography

 Louder (2014)
 Places (2017)
 Christmas in the City (2019)
 Forever (2021)

Soundtracks and cast recordings

 Spring Awakening original Broadway cast recording
 Glee soundtrack
 New Year's Eve soundtrack
 Legends of Oz: Dorothy's Return soundtrack
 Funny Girl revival Broadway cast recording

Written works
 Brunette Ambition (2014)
 You First: Journal Your Way to Your Best Life (2015)

See also

 List of songs in Glee (seasons 1, 2, 3, 4, 5 and 6)
 List of animal rights advocates

Notes

References

External links 

 
 
 
 

 
1986 births
Living people
20th-century American actresses
20th-century American singers
20th-century American women singers
21st-century American actresses
21st-century American singers
21st-century American women singers
Actresses from New Jersey
Actresses from New York City
American child actresses
American child singers
American women pop singers
American film actresses
American musical theatre actresses
American people of Greek-Jewish descent
American people of Italian descent
American sopranos
American television actresses
American voice actresses
Child pop musicians
Columbia Records artists
HIV/AIDS activists
American LGBT rights activists
New Jersey Democrats
People from Brentwood, Los Angeles
People from Tenafly, New Jersey
People from the Bronx
Singers from New Jersey
Singers from New York City
Tenafly High School alumni